Pi Cassiopeiae, Latinized from π Cassiopeiae, is a close binary star system in the constellation Cassiopeia. It is visible to the naked eye with an apparent visual magnitude of +4.949. Based upon an annual parallax shift of 18.63 mas as seen from Earth, this system is located about 175 light years from the Sun.

This is a double-lined spectroscopic binary system with an orbital period of nearly two days in a circular orbit. It is classified as a rotating ellipsoidal variable star and its brightness varies by 0.02 magnitudes with a period of 23.57 hours, which equals half of its orbital period. The spectrum matches that of an A-type main-sequence star with a stellar classification of A5 V.  The two stars have similar masses and spectra.  A star at a projected separation of  has been identified as a possible white dwarf.  It is at the same distance as Pi Cassiopeiae and shares a common proper motion.  The age of the white dwarf is calculated to be about 500 million years.

Pi Cassiopeiae has been given the spectral class of kA3hF1mA5, indicating an Am star, but this is now considered doubtful.

References

A-type main-sequence stars
Spectroscopic binaries
Rotating ellipsoidal variables
Cassiopeia (constellation)
Cassiopeiae, Pi
Durchmusterung objects
Cassiopeiae, 20
004058
003414
0184